Redwire Corporation is an American aerospace manufacturer and space infrastructure technology company headquartered in Jacksonville, Florida. The company was formed on June 1, 2020 by the private equity firm AE Industrial Partners.

History 
Formed on June 1, 2020, by private equity firm AE Industrial Partners, Redwire was initially created through the merger of Adcole Space and Deep Space Systems. Shortly after formation, on June 24, 2020, Redwire acquired Jacksonville, Florida-based Made In Space, Inc. The addition of Made in Space added 3D printing to the company's portfolio. On September 15, 2020, Redwire announced that it was moving its headquarters to Jacksonville.

Redwire's acquisitions continued throughout 2020 and 2021. Longmont, Colorado-based Roccor was acquired by Redwire on October 29, 2020. The acquisition added capabilities in the manufacturing of solar panels, antennas, and deployable booms. The payload launch technology maker, LoadPath, was acquired on December 15, 2020. Redwire acquired Littleton, Colorado based Oakman Aerospace on January 19, 2021. Deployable Space Systems was acquired by on February 23, 2021, adding Roll Out Solar Array (ROSA) capabilities to Redwire's portfolio.

Redwire announced on March 25, 2021 its intentions to go public through a merger with the SPAC Genesis Park Acquisition Corp., valuing the company at US$615 million.

Operations 
Redwire and subsidiaries operate throughout the United States, with locations in Florida, Colorado, California, Alabama, Massachusetts, Indiana and New Mexico. The company consists of the following subsidiaries:

Adcole Space 

Adcole Space, a former component of Adcole Corporation, specializes in the design, manufacturing, integration and testing of spacecraft components for application in the commercial, research and military sectors. Located in Marlborough, Massachusetts, Adcole Space focuses on high performance, high reliability sun sensors and other spacecraft components.

Deep Space Systems 

Based in Littleton, Colorado, Deep Space Systems (DSS) is focused on systems engineering, spacecraft design, development, integration and testing, deep space mission operations, and high-definition space-qualified cameras. DSS was incorporated in 2001, and was a founding component of Redwire, after its merger on June 1, 2020 with Adcole Space. DSS is considered a "main contractor" for NASA's Commercial Lunar Payload Services (CLPS) program, and can sub-contract projects to other companies of their choice. DSS is also working on a lander concept focused on scouting south polar lunar resources.

Deployable Space Systems 

Deployable Space Systems, Inc. (DSSI) specializes in the development of deployable technologies for space applications. Located in Goleta, California, DSSI designs, analyzes, builds, tests and delivers deployable solar arrays, deployable structures and space system products. Product and research areas include deployable solar array systems, rigid panel, flexible blanket, and concentrator systems with crystalline or thin film photovoltaic deployable structural/mechanical systems, articulated structures, open-lattice structures, booms, elastic deployable structures, roll-out booms, deployable reflectors, deployable occulters, sun shades, subsystems, high efficiency photovoltaic flexible and rigid blanket/panel assemblies (with photovoltaic partners), launch restraint release systems, mechanisms and actuators.

LoadPath 
Based in Albuquerque, New Mexico, LoadPath specializes in mechanical, structural, and thermal technologies for satellite and space launch applications. Unique capabilities include space mechanisms, multi-payload launch adapters, structural testing, deployable composite booms, deployable space structures, R&D engineering, spacecraft thermal management components, and thermal analysis. LoadPath is controlled by an AS9100 certified quality management system.

Made In Space, Inc. 

Based in Jacksonville, Florida, Made In Space specializes in the development and manufacturing of three-dimensional printers for use in microgravity. Founded in August 2010 by Aaron Kemmer, Jason Dunn, Mike Chen, and Michael Snyder, Made in Space has a general focus on manufacturing technologies that support exploration, national security, and sustainable space settlement.

Oakman Aerospace 
Based in Littleton, Colorado, Oakman Aerospace, Inc. was co-founded by Stanley Oakman Kennedy, Jr., Maureen S. O’Brien, and Stanley Oakman Kennedy, Sr. in July 2012. The Littleton facility has approximately 11,300 square feet of test laboratory and office space, which includes 1,000 square feet of engineering laboratory space, several test areas, and modular test stations. OAI has the capability and capacity to simultaneously design, assemble, integrate, and test programs or perform multiple technology test and evaluation efforts.  The assembly and test laboratories are equipped with regularly calibrated measuring and test equipment. The laboratories have six independent workstations equipped with modern assembly equipment and tools. The facility is in full compliance with all OSHA and State safety requirements.  OAI laboratory space has the ability to host flight components using clean room level laminar flow benches with individual temperature and humidity controls. Oakman is building a satellite ground station with 5.5 m dish at Chippewa County International Airport.

Roccor 
Based in Longmont, Colorado, Roccor is a manufacturer of solar panels, antennas, and deployable booms. Launched on May 5, 2010, by founder Will Francis, its acquisition by Redwire was announced on October 29, 2020. Roccor was an 80-person company at the time of acquisition.

See also 

 Interorbital Systems
 List of crewed spacecraft
 Archinaut
 Thorlabs

References

External links 
 

 
Space technology
Aerospace companies of the United States
Commercial spaceflight
Human spaceflight programs
Space tourism
Space technology research institutes
Companies based in Jacksonville, Florida
Technology companies established in 2020
Technology companies based in the Jacksonville area
Technology companies based in Florida
Publicly traded companies based in Jacksonville, Florida
Multinational companies based in Jacksonville
Companies listed on the New York Stock Exchange
Special-purpose acquisition companies